Violet L. Fisher is a retired bishop in The United Methodist Church, elected and consecrated to the Episcopacy in 2000.

Born August 29, 1939, Bishop Violet L. Fisher graduated from Bowie State University with a BS in 1962. She received a M. Ed. from George Washington University in 1978. She attained a D. D., Baltimore College of Bible in 1984 and also received an M. Div., Eastern Baptist Theological Seminary in 1988.

Violet Fisher has one son, Marcus. She was the first African-American woman to be elected to the episcopacy in the Northeast Jurisdiction of the United Methodist Church. She served as Bishop of the Western and North Central New York Annual Conference from 2000 to 2008.

Ordained ministry
Ordained Elder in Full Connection, King's Apostle Holiness Church of God Conference, Inc., 1965
Appointed National Evangelist Northeastern Region, King's Apostle Holiness Church of God Conference, Inc., 1975
Ordained Deacon, Eastern Pennsylvania Conference, United Methodist Church, 1988
Associate Pastor St. Daniel's UMC, Chester, PA, 1988–90
Ordained Elder in Full Connection, Eastern Pennsylvania Conference, 1990
Pastor Sayer's Memorial UMC, Philadelphia, PA, 1990–94
District Superintendent, Mary McLeod Bethune District, 1994 - 2000
Bishop of the New York West Area, 2000-2008

References
The Council of Bishops of the United Methodist Church 
InfoServ, the official information service of The United Methodist Church.

See also
 List of bishops of the United Methodist Church

United Methodist bishops of the Northeastern Jurisdiction
African-American Methodist clergy
American Methodist clergy
Bowie State University alumni
George Washington University Graduate School of Education and Human Development alumni
Palmer Theological Seminary alumni
Living people
Women Methodist bishops

1939 births